Mas-d'Orcières is a former commune in the Lozère department in southern France. On 1 January 2017, it was merged into the new commune Mont Lozère et Goulet. Its population was 87 in 2019.

See also
Communes of the Lozère department

References

Masdorcieres